Barr Settlement is a community in the Canadian province of Nova Scotia, located in Hants County.

References

Communities in Hants County, Nova Scotia
General Service Areas in Nova Scotia